Yeison Estiven Guzmán Gómez (born 22 March 1998) is a Colombian professional footballer who plays as an attacking midfielder for Tolima.

Club career

Envigado
Born in La Unión, Antioquia, Guzmán was an Envigado youth graduate. He made his first team debut at the age of 17 on 10 February 2016, coming on as a second-half substitute for Diego Gregori in a 0–0 home draw against Rionegro Águilas, for the year's Copa Colombia.

Guzmán made his Categoría Primera A debut on 26 February 2017, replacing Joseph Cox late into a 1–2 away loss against Deportes Tolima. After only ten league appearances in the 2017 campaign, he became a regular starter in 2018, and scored his first senior goal on 18 February 2018 in a 1–0 home win against Once Caldas.

On 16 May 2018, Guzmán scored a brace in a 2–1 away success over Deportivo Pasto in the national cup. On 28 September of the following year, he scored a hat-trick in a 3–2 win at Atlético Bucaramanga.

On 11 February 2021, Guzmán renewed his contract for a further three years.

Cruzeiro transfer controversy
On 15 April 2021, Brazilian Série B side Cruzeiro announced that they reached an agreement with Envigado for the transfer of Guzmán, with the player signing a four-year deal. However, after being "unsure" about some details of the negotiation, Guzmán did not move to his new club, and the deal was cancelled on 20 April, after Envigado released an announcement stating that Guzmán would continue at the club; Cruzeiro also announced that he would take legal actions against the player.

Career statistics

References

External links 
 

1998 births
Living people
Sportspeople from Antioquia Department
Colombian footballers
Association football midfielders
Categoría Primera A players
Envigado F.C. players
21st-century Colombian people